The Abolitionist was the name of a variety of publications that appeared during the 1830s. This article is about the Abolitionist that was a publication of the New York State Anti-Slavery Society, edited and published by Wm. Lloyd Garrison, and printed by him and his partner Isaac Knapp. 12 issues appeared in 1833. All 12 issues have been digitized.

References

Magazines published in New York (state)
William Lloyd Garrison
1833 establishments in New York (state)
1833 disestablishments in New York (state)
Defunct magazines published in the United States